John of Berry or John the Magnificent (French: Jean de Berry, ; 30 November 1340 – 15 June 1416) was Duke of Berry and Auvergne and Count of Poitiers and Montpensier. He was Regent of France from 1380 to 1388 during the minority of his nephew Charles VI. His brothers were King Charles V of France, Duke Louis I of Anjou and Duke Philip the Bold of Burgundy.

John is primarily remembered as a collector of the important illuminated manuscripts and other works of art commissioned by him, such as the Très Riches Heures. His personal motto was Le temps venra ("the time will come").

Biography

John was born at the castle of Vincennes on 30 November 1340,  the third son of King John II of France and Bonne of Luxembourg. In 1356, he was made Count of Poitou by his father, and in 1358 he was named king's lieutenant of Auvergne, Languedoc, Périgord, and Poitou to administer those regions in his father's name while the king was a captive of the English. When Poitiers was ceded to England in 1360, his father granted John the newly raised duchies of Berry and Auvergne. By the terms of the Treaty of Brétigny, signed that May, John became a hostage of the English Crown and remained in England until 1369. Upon his return to France, his brother, now King Charles V, appointed him lieutenant general for Berry, Auvergne, Bourbonnais, Forez, Sologne, Touraine, Anjou, Maine, and Normandy.

Service as regent
Upon the death of his older brother Charles V in 1380, his son and heir, Charles VI was a minor, so John and his brothers, along with the king's maternal uncle the Duke of Bourbon acted as regents. He was also appointed Lieutenant General in Languedoc in November of the same year, where he was forced to deal with the Harelle, a peasants' revolt spurred by heavy taxation in support of the war effort against the English. Following the death of Louis of Anjou in 1384, John and his brother Burgundy were the dominant figures in the kingdom. The king ended the regency and took power into his own hands in 1388, giving the governance of the kingdom largely to his father's former ministers, who were political enemies of the king's powerful uncles. John was also stripped of his offices in Languedoc at that time. John and Burgundy bided their time, and were soon able to retake power, in 1392, when the King had his first attack of insanity, an affliction which would remain with him throughout his life. The two royal dukes continued to rule until 1402, when the king, in one of his moments of lucidity, took power from them and gave it to his brother Louis, Duke of Orléans.

Simon of Cramaud, a canonist and prelate, served John in his efforts to find a way to end the Great Western schism that was not unfavorable to French interests.

Later life
In his later years, John became a more conciliatory figure in France. After the death of Philip the Bold in 1404, he was the last surviving son of King John, and generally tried to play the role of a peacemaker between the factions of his nephews Orléans and John the Fearless. After the murder of Orléans at the orders of the Duke of Burgundy, he generally took the Orléanist or Armagnac side in the civil war that erupted, but was always a moderate figure, attempting to reconcile the two sides and promote internal peace.  It was largely due to John's urging that Charles VI and his sons were not present at the Battle of Agincourt in 1415.  Remembering his father's fate as a captive after the Battle of Poitiers 59 years before, he feared the fate of France should the king and his heirs be taken captive and successfully prevented their participation. John died on 15 June 1416 in Paris a few months after the battle, which proved as disastrous as he had feared.

Family and children
John had the following issue by his first wife, Joanna of Armagnac (1346–1387), whom he married in 1360:
Bonne of Berry (1367–1435), who succeeded him as Viscountess of Carlat and married first Amadeus VII, Count of Savoy, and then Bernard VII, Count of Armagnac
Charles of Berry, Count of Montpensier (1371–1383)
Jeanne of Berry (1373–1375)
Beatrice of Berry (April 1374)
Marie of Berry (1375–1434), who succeeded him as Duchess of Auvergne and married first Louis III of Châtillon, then Philip of Artois, Count of Eu and finally John I, Duke of Bourbon
John de Valois, Count of Montpensier, (1375/1376–1397), first married Catherine of France, daughter of Charles V, King of France; and later married Anne de Bourbon
Louis of Berry (1383, died young)

Illegitimate son by a Scottish woman: 
Owuoald (1370 – before 1382), born in England during John's captivity.

In 1389 he married his second wife, Joan II, Countess of Auvergne (c.1378-1424).

Art patron

John of Berry was also a notable patron who commissioned among other works the most famous Book of Hours, the Très Riches Heures. "Like other works produced on the duke’s auspices, this model of elegance reflected many of the artistic tendencies of the time in its fusion of Flemish realism, of the refined Parisian style, and of Italian panel-painting techniques." Admiring the artistic productions of Jean Pucelle, John employed several well-known artists such as the Limbourg Brothers, Jacquemart de Hesdin, the Master of the Brussels Initials, and André Beauneveu. His curiosity to illumination and patronage led to much success on preserving and absorbing talented miniaturist painters. His spending on his art collection severely taxed his estates, and he was deeply in debt when he died in 1416 at Paris.

Works created for him include the manuscripts known as the Très Riches Heures, the Belles Heures of Jean de France, Duc de Berry and (parts of) the Turin-Milan Hours. Goldsmith's work includes the Holy Thorn Reliquary and Royal Gold Cup, both in the British Museum.

The web site of the Louvre says of him: After the death of John's maternal grandfather, John the Blind, during the Battle of Crecy (1346), the famed court composer and poet Guillaume de Machaut entered into the service of John of Berry.

Ancestors

Footnotes

Sources

External links

Stein, Wendy A.  "Patronage of Jean de Berry (1340–1416)". In Heilbrunn Timeline of Art History. New York: The Metropolitan Museum of Art, 2000–.  (May 2009)

|-

|-

|-

|-

|-

|-

|-

1340 births
1416 deaths
14th-century viceregal rulers
People from Vincennes
Military governors of Paris
Dukes of Berry
Dukes of Auvergne
Dukes of Montpensier
Counts of Angoulême
House of Valois-Burgundy
French art collectors
Jure uxoris officeholders
14th-century peers of France
15th-century peers of France
Sons of kings